A dollar is a unit of reactivity for a nuclear reactor, calibrated to the interval between the conditions of delayed criticality and prompt criticality. Zero dollars is defined to be the threshold of slow criticality, which means a steady reaction rate. One dollar is defined to be the threshold of prompt criticality, which means a nuclear excursion or explosion.

Meaning and use
Each nuclear fission produces several neutrons that can be absorbed, escape from the reactor, or go on to cause more fissions in a chain reaction. When an average of one neutron from each fission goes on to cause another fission, the reactor is just barely "critical" and the chain reaction proceeds at a constant power level.

Most neutrons produced in fission are "prompt", i.e., created with the fission products in less than about 10 nanoseconds (a "shake" of time). But certain fission products produce additional neutrons when they decay up to several minutes after their creation by fission. These delayed-release neutrons, a few percent of the total, are key to stable nuclear reactor control. Without delayed neutrons, in a reactor that was just barely above critical, reactor power would increase exponentially on millisecond or even microsecond timescales – much too fast to be controlled with current or near-future technology. Such a rapid power increase can also happen in a real reactor when the chain reaction is sustained without the help of the delayed neutrons. This is prompt criticality, the most extreme example of which is an exploding nuclear weapon where considerable design effort goes into keeping the core deep into prompt criticality for as long as possible until the greatest attainable percentage of material has fissioned.

By definition, a reactivity of zero dollars is just barely on the edge of criticality using both prompt and delayed neutrons. A reactivity less than zero dollars is subcritical; the power level will decrease exponentially and a sustained chain reaction will not occur. One dollar is defined as the threshold between delayed and prompt criticality. At prompt criticality, on average each fission will cause exactly one additional fission via prompt neutrons, and the delayed neutrons will then increase power. Any reactivity above $0 is supercritical and power will increase exponentially, but between $0 and $1 the power rise will be slow enough to be easily and safely controlled with mechanical control rods because the chain reaction partly depends on the delayed neutrons. A power reactor operating at steady state (constant power) will therefore have an average reactivity of $0, with small fluctuations above and below this value.

Reactivity can also be expressed in relative terms, such as "5 cents above prompt critical".

While power reactors are carefully designed and operated to avoid prompt criticality under all circumstances, many small research or "zero power" reactors are designed to be intentionally placed into prompt criticality (reactivity > $1) with complete safety by rapidly withdrawing their control rods. Their fuel elements are designed so that as they heat up, reactivity is automatically and quickly reduced through effects such as doppler broadening and thermal expansion. Such reactors can be "pulsed" to very high power levels (e.g., several GW) for a few milliseconds, after which reactivity automatically drops to $0 and a relatively low and constant power level (e.g. several hundred kW) is maintained until shut down manually by reinserting the control rods.

Subcritical reactors, which thus far have only been built at laboratory scale, would constantly run in "negative dollars" (most likely a few cents below [delayed] critical) with the "missing" neutrons provided by an external neutron source, e.g. spallation driven by a particle accelerator in an accelerator-driven subcritical reactor.

History
According to Alvin Weinberg and Eugene Wigner, Louis Slotin was the first to propose the name "dollar" for the interval of reactivity between barely critical and prompt criticality, and "cents" for the decimal fraction of the dollar.

References

Neutron
Units of measurement
Nuclear physics
Nuclear power
Nuclear facilities